Vivian Jeanette Kaplan (born June 17, 1946) is a Canadian writer and business owner.

The daughter of Gerda Kosiner, she was born in Shanghai. Her parents were Jews from Vienna; her mother tongue was German. Kaplan came to Canada with her parents at the age of two; the family settled in Toronto. She studied English, French and Spanish at the University of Toronto. Kaplan operated Vivian Kaplan Oriental Interiors, a company which imported home furnishings from East Asia, for twenty years.

She wrote her family's story in Ten Green Bottles: The True Story of One Family's Journey from War-Torn Austria to the Ghettos of Shanghai. The book received the Canadian Jewish Book Award in 2003 and the Adei-Wizo Prize presented in Florence, Italy in 2007. A play based on the book was brought to the stage in Toronto in 2009.

In 2012, Kaplan published a historical novel Blind Vision.

References

External links 
 

1946 births
Living people
Jewish Canadian writers
Canadian biographers
University of Toronto alumni